Benjamin Collings (born 1976) is an American politician from Maine. Collings, a Democrat was first elected to the Maine House of Representatives (District 42) in 2016. A political and business consultant, Collings has worked on various campaigns including most notably as the state director for Bernie Sanders in 2016. He successfully sponsored a bill to rename Columbus Day in favor of Indigenous Peoples' Day.

Collings grew up in Fort Kent, Maine and earned a social science degree from the University of Maine at Fort Kent.

References

1976 births
Living people
People from Fort Kent, Maine
University of Maine at Fort Kent alumni
Politicians from Portland, Maine
Democratic Party members of the Maine House of Representatives
21st-century American politicians